Kevin Tuite (Irish: Caoimhín de Tiúit; born April 3, 1954) is a full Professor of Anthropology at the Université de Montréal. He is a citizen of both Canada and Ireland. His special interest is in Caucasian linguistics, and he has occasionally published on the topic of Georgian mythology.

Biography
Tuite was born 3 April 1954, in South Bend, Indiana, USA. He received a BA in chemical engineering from Northwestern University in 1976,  and a Ph.D. in linguistics from the University of Chicago in 1988. His doctoral thesis was "Number agreement and morphosyntactic orientation in the Kartvelian languages". From 1991 on, he has been a member of the faculty at Université de Montréal: professeur adjoint 1991–1996, professeur agrégé 1996–2002, professeur titulaire 2002–present. From 2010 through 2014 he was the Chair of Caucasian studies at Friedrich-Schiller-Universität Jena.

Books
Kartvelian Morphosyntax. Number agreement and morphosyntactic orientation in the South Caucasian languages. (Studies in Caucasian Linguistics, 12). München: Lincom Europa. 1998
 Svan (Languages of the World / Materials, vol. 139). München: Lincom Europa, 1997.
An anthology of Georgian folk poetry. Madison, NJ: Fairleigh Dickinson University Press, 1994.

References

External links
Official webpage at Université de Montréal
Official CV at Université de Montréal.

1954 births
Linguists from the United States
Linguists from Canada
Canadian anthropologists
Kartvelian studies scholars
Svan language
Academic staff of the Université de Montréal
People from South Bend, Indiana
Living people
20th-century linguists
20th-century American anthropologists
21st-century linguists
21st-century American anthropologists